Hurry Up, or I'll Be 30 (also known as I Am Waiting No More) is a 1973 American comedy-drama film starring John Lefkowitz, Linda De Coff, and Danny DeVito. The film was directed by Joseph Jacoby.

This film is one of several critically acclaimed low-budget films of the 1970s. The picture had its official New York City theatrical release, presented by Joseph E. Levine, in November 1973 to high national critical acclaim, with noted film critic Vincent Canby of The New York Times calling it "A wryly affectionate portrait of a younger 'Marty'."  In December 2009, The New York Times re-printed Canby's 1973 review in a piece that selected three pictures from the 1970s.

In 2009 the copyright owners of the picture, Jacoby Entertainment, Ltd., were alerted to the circulation of unauthorized and sub-standard DVDs in the marketplace, appearing under the name of I Am Waiting No More. The unlicensed copies featured a pilfered photograph of Danny DeVito taken from a different source at a much later time. The disseminators of the illegal DVDs were identified by the picture's copyright owner and were successfully sued in California civil court.

Plot
The film follows a Brooklyn man (John Lefkowitz) who begins to suffer a severe identity crisis as he is about to turn 30. As his birthday approaches, he is forced to come to terms with his lack of success — in business, in love, and in general. Desperate to make his life a success, he tries to commit himself to a serious relationship and do the things 30-year-olds are supposed to do based on the standards of society.

Cast
 John Lefkowitz as George Trapani
 Linda De Coff as Jackie Tice (as Linda DeCoff)
 Ronald Anton as Vince Trapani
 Maureen Byrnes as Flo
 Danny DeVito as Petey

See also
 List of American films of 1973

References

External links
 

1973 films
1973 comedy-drama films
American comedy-drama films
Embassy Pictures films
Films set in New York City
Films shot in New York City
1970s English-language films
1970s American films